Saiva cardinalis is a species of lantern bug in the genus Saiva, found to the North-East of India (Darjiling, Sikkim), Nepal and Vietnam. No subspecies are listed in the Catalogue of Life.

References

External links
 
 

Fulgorinae